Prue O’Donovan is the current  Archdeacon of Flinders in the Anglican Diocese of Willochra: she is its Ministry Development Officer.

References

Archdeacons of Flinders
Living people
Year of birth missing (living people)
Place of birth missing (living people)